Loreto College is an all-girls catholic secondary school in Mullingar, County Westmeath, Ireland. It is connected with the international group of schools served by the Sisters of Loreto.

History
The school was opened in 1853 by Sister Bernadette O'Connor, a Loreto sister originally from County Sligo.

On 5 May 2011, Minister Willie Penrose officially turned over the first sod signifying the start of a major extension / refurbishment programme to take place in the Loreto College, Mullingar. Work then commenced on a new gymnasium, new office space- allowing the current office space to be turned into classrooms, new playing fields consisting of a basketball court and Astroturf, the conversion of the existing canteen into science labs and the general refurbishment of the existing school building.
It is hoped that all 750 students and staff will be settled into their new improved school within twelve to eighteen months.

References

Secondary schools in County Westmeath
Catholic secondary schools in the Republic of Ireland
Mullingar
1853 establishments in Ireland
Educational institutions established in 1853